The Pascal Paoli is a RoPax ferry owned and operated by SNCM. She was the last ferry built by the Van der Giessen de Noord yard. On January 5, 2016, Pascal Paoli was transferred to the Maritime Corse Méditerranée, a new entity succeeding SNCM following its takeover by the Corsican businessman Patrick Rocca. On February 3, after a technical stop at the Tunisian yards of Menzel Bourguiba, the ship arrived in Marseilles without any commercial markings. At the end of May 2016, the ship received the red livery of Corsica Linea, the trademark of the Corsican consortium Corsica Maritima which merged with the MCM. The ship departed Marseille for Bastia on May 25, 2016, for its first voyage under its new colors.

Name
The ship is named after Filippo Antonio Pasquale de' Paoli (6 April 1725 – 5 February 1807), a Corsican patriot, statesman and military leader who was at the forefront of resistance movements against the Genoese and later French rule in Corsica. He became the president of the Executive Council of the General Diet of the People of Corsica, and also designed and wrote the Constitution of the state.

Routes
The Pascal Paoli operates between Marseilles and Bastia on the island of Corsica. The 220 nautical mile overnight trip takes 12 hours.

Boarding by GIGN

On September 27, 2005, during the social unrest following the decision to privatize SNCM that owned and operated the ship, striking sailors of the Corsican Workers' Trade Union occupied the Pascal Paoli, docked at the seawall off the port of Marseille, with the plan to move the ship to Bastia. The commander was instructed to steer the ship to Corsica.

After departure, Pascal Paoli was approached by military helicopters. The ship arrived in the vicinity of Bastia around 11 pm but did not approach, as the striking sailors wished, and spent the night a few cable lengths from port. In the early hours of September 28, after authorities had taken a decision overnight, members of the Hubert and GIGN commando, with five helicopters, took possession of the ship. The striking sailors did not resist, and the soldiers gained control of the ship. Under Navy escort, the ship was directed towards Toulon, where it docked in the enclosure of the naval base. The ship remained there until October 13, when it departed for Marseille in the evening.

References

Ferries of France
2002 ships
Ships built in the Netherlands